Mardasovo is a rural locality (a village) in Novlenskoye Rural Settlement, Vologodsky District, Vologda Oblast, Russia. The population was 24 as of 2002.

Geography 
Mardasovo is located 72 km northwest of Vologda (the district's administrative centre) by road. Sevastyanovo is the nearest rural locality.

References 

Rural localities in Vologodsky District